Carlene Starkey (born ) is a former American badminton player. She is married to former badminton player Rod Starkey.

She was member of the American team that won the Uber Cup in 1963.

Carlene Starkey and Larry Saben obtained the mixed doubles title of the U.S. Open in 1968, while together with Caroline Hein and Diane Hales, Carlene won the US National Badminton titles in the women's doubles category in 1971 and 1975.

Carlene also competed in the Mexican Open where she won the women's singles in 1974. In the women's doubles event, she won the title in 1962 together with Pat Gallagher, in 1966 teaming up with Lucero Soto de Peniche, in 1967 playing with Diane Hales, in 1971 together with Judianne Kelly, in 1972 with Gay Meyer, and 1974 and 1975 with Maryanne Breckell. She also won the mixed doubles category in 1967 together with Francisco Sañudo, in 1974 with Flemming Delfs, and in 1975 with Paul Whetnall.

Sporting achievements

Reference list 

American female badminton players
Living people
Year of birth uncertain
1940s births
21st-century American women